This is a list of characters from the light novel Oresuki, which revolves around Amatsuyu "Joro" Kisaragi, an ordinary high school student who is invited out alone by two beautiful girls: the upperclassman Sakura "Cosmos" Akino and his childhood friend Aoi "Himawari" Hinata. Expecting to hear their confessions, he triumphantly goes to meet each of them in turn. However, both Cosmos and Himawari confess to Joro that they like his best friend, Taiyо̄ "Sun-chan" Ōga, instead of him. He reluctantly agrees to help both girls pursue Sun-chan on the hope of dating the loser, only to suddenly be confessed to by the unremarkable bookworm Sumireko "Pansy" Sanshokuin, who is the girl Sun-chan is in love with.

Characters

Main characters

Amatsuyu, nicknamed , is a second-year student at Nishikizuta High School who is best friends with Sun-chan, the likable ace of their local baseball team and childhood friends with Himawari, who follows him everywhere. One day, Joro is asked out by Cosmos, the Student Council President, and Himawari for two consecutive dates over the weekend. At the end of these dates, both girls confess that they're in love with Sun-chan, at which point Joro reveals that he purposefully cultivated the "friendly, obtuse boy" personality to lure both girls into liking him and that the true personality he keeps hidden is much more harsh and aggressive. He reluctantly agrees to help both girls pursue Sun-chan in the hope of dating the loser, only to suddenly be confessed to by the unremarkable bookworm Pansy, who reveals that she knows all of Joro's secrets and fell in love with his true personality.

Sumireko, nicknamed , is a second-year student and library helper at Nishikizuta High School. Pansy looks like an unattractive gloomy bookworm with long black hair tied in braids, thick glasses and a sharp tongue towards Joro. In truth, she has stalked him and learned all his secrets and is aware of his dual-faced nature, and blackmails him into coming to spend lunch break time with her at the library. She is in love with Joro, which he doesn't take well. She is very observant of people and could discern Sun-chan's true nature. Beneath her unappealing exterior, she is in fact a gorgeous beauty with a bust size far larger than she typically shows. Following her help, Joro reluctantly decides to visit her regularly at the school library during lunchtimes and after school.

Aoi, nicknamed , is a second-year student at Nishikizuta High School and Joro's childhood friend. She is in love with Sun-chan, and requests Joro's help to succeed in her romance. Like Sakura, she too begins to realize her feelings for Joro after Sun-chan's true nature is revealed to her. She is an avid tennis player.

Sakura, nicknamed , is a third-year student and the Student Council President at Nishikizuta High School; as such, she is very organized and rarely late to any meeting. Cosmos always carries with her a notebook, which she often uses to take notes and make meticulous plans, as she gets nervous whenever faced with a scenario she hasn't planned for. Cosmos is initially in love with Sun-chan, and originally requests Joro's help to succeed in her romance. However, after Sun-chan's manipulations are revealed, she redirects her attention toward Joro, with whom she develops genuine feelings for. She and Pansy form a cordial rivalry, as neither girl intends to lose to the other.

Taiyо̄, nicknamed , is a second-year student at Nishikizuta High School and Joro's best friend since middle-school. He is the ace of the Baseball Club, who is popular in school due to his friendly and caring demeanor. He is the target of affection of both Himawari and Cosmos, but is in love with Pansy. His warm personality is only a mere facade as Sun-chan is in fact, extremely selfish, prideful and spiteful and has held a grudge towards Joro ever since he learned the girl he liked in middle school liked his friend. Hurt at the prospect of "losing" against Joro, he is well aware of the feelings of Himawari and Cosmos and manipulates them both with uncaring malice in order to destroy Joro's social reputation. He is eventually discovered by Pansy and Joro and is forced to apologize for his actions. Despite his betrayal, Taiyо̄ eventually reconciles with his friends, although he still keeps his feelings for Pansy.

Nishikizuta High School

Hina, nicknamed , is a second-year student and member of Newspaper Club at Nishikizuta High School who is in love with Joro. She uses her position in the Club to spread false information, isolate Joro from his friends, steal Sun-chan's spot in the Flower Festival Dance, and set herself up as the only girl he can depend on. After her scheme is exposed by Cosmos, she is harshly rejected by Joro and promises to make amends for her actions.

Chiharu, nicknamed , is a second-year student who transfers to Joro's class at Nishikizuta High School. She works at her family's restaurant and sold food at a stall during the baseball game. She fell in love with Joro when he bought her food and shared it with Sun-chan to cheer him up after the game. After introducing herself and meeting his friends, she extends an invitation to Joro to work at her family restaurant.

After meeting Joro at the pool and making amends for her actions, she fell in love with him and changed her appearance from a pink, twin-tailed gyaru, to a long, black-haired demure look because Joro said that was his preference.

Chifuyu, nicknamed  is Tsubaki's childhood friend, who transfers to Nishikizuta High School. Her family runs a fried chicken skewer restaurant, which rivals with Tsubaki's family's. She seems to have some strange connection with Tsubaki, and ends up co-incidentally following Tsubaki every time she moves, ending up in Nishikizuta High School, where the two of them have a competition see which one can sell the most skewers during the sports festival.

Nishikizuta Baseball Club

Ichika, nicknamed , is a high school student who becomes temporary manager of the Baseball Club at Nishikizuta High School.

Kaito is a student and both the captain and right fielder of the Baseball Club at Nishikizuta High School.

Yōichi is a student and batter of the Baseball Club at Nishikizuta High School.

Yuma is a student and center fielder of the Baseball Club at Nishikizuta High School.

Tatsuo is a student and catcher of the Baseball Club at Nishikizuta High School. He was nicknamed "Shiba-nyan" by Anemone.

Nishikizuta Softball Club

Nadeshiko, nicknamed , is a student and member of the Softball Club at Nishikizuta High School. Although she is so far the only character who is called by her real name, "Nadeshiko" is still considered a nickname, since it's based on the Japanese term "Yamato nadeshiko", which is associated with Dianthus superbus, a flowering plant native to Japan.

Sakura, nicknamed , is a student and member of the Softball Club at Nishikizuta High School.

Toshōbu High School

Momo, nicknamed , is the student council president at Toshōbu High School. She is in love with Hose but suppresses her feelings for him because her best friend, Tsukimi, also likes him. She realizes that love and friendship cannot co-exist so Tsukimi and Cherry choose to preserve their friendship rather than pursue Hose.

Luna, nicknamed , is a student at Toshōbu High School and Hose's childhood friend. She is also in love with Hose but realises that since Cherry, her best friend, also like him they would be love rivals. Instead, they both agree to suppress their feelings and prioritise Hose's happiness over their feelings.

Yasuo, nicknamed , is a student at Toshōbu High School and a former junior high schoolmate of Pansy. After spending time with her throughout middle school, he develops feelings for her. However, Pansy does not reciprocate those feelings because she says Hose doesn't take into account other's people's feelings and that, through his benevolence and kindness, other people are negatively affected such as Tsukimi and Cherry. It is because of him that Joro actually falls in love with Pansy.

Kitakaze, nicknamed , is a second-year student at Toshōbu High School, who is also Sun-chan's rival.

Akane, nicknamed , is a student at Toshōbu High School who, due to her shyness, covers most of her face with her hair and communicates only by text message on her cellphone. She also believes herself to be Cherry's "best".

Asuka, nicknamed , is a student at Toshōbu High School who admires Sasanqua.

Other characters

Keike, nicknamed  by Pansy, is Joro's energetic and kind mother.

Marika, nicknamed , is Joro's diligent and charismatic older sister, who returns to live with her family after breaking up with her boyfriend.

Hinoto, nicknamed , is a former classmate of Himawari during their elementary school period, who currently lives in Hokkaido.

References

Oresuki